The following is an incomplete list of association football clubs based in Guinea-Bissau.

For a complete list see :Category:Football clubs in Guinea-Bissau

A
Académica de Ingoré
Acaja Club
ADR Desportivo de Mansabá
Agril
Aguias Guine No Lanta
Ajuda United
Atlético Clube de Bissorã

B
Babaque - Farim
Blofib

C
Caça em Quinhamel
F.C. Catacumba
FC Cuntum

D
Desportivo Quelele
Desportivo de Biombo
Djaraf

E
EN Bolama

F
Farim

G
Green Sunrise

J
Jagudis de Biombo

M
Mavegro Futebol Clube

O
Oio Soccer Club
OS Balantas

P
Prabis

Q
Quinara FC

T
Tite AFC
Tombali SC

U
União Desportiva Internacional

V
F.C.Vitoria Cacheu

External links
 RSSSF

 
Guinea-Bissau
Football clubs